Platysticta apicalis, the dark forestwraith, is a species of damselfly in family Platystictidae. It is endemic to Sri Lanka.

References

External links
 Query Result
 Asian Odonates
 Animal diversity web
 Sri Lanka Endemics
 List of odonates of Sri Lanka

Damselflies of Sri Lanka
Insects described in 1894